Glory of Womanhood is a World War I song written and composed by Harry J. Lincoln. It was first published in 1917 by Vandersloot Music Publishing Company in Williamsport, PA. The cover features the drawing of a nurse and is dedicated to the womanhood of all nations.

The sheet music can be found at the Pritzker Military Museum & Library.

References 

Bibliography
Parker, Bernard S. World War I Sheet Music 1. Jefferson: McFarland & Company, Inc., 2007. .

External links 
 Sheet music and song MP3 at the Illinois Digital Archive

1917 songs
Songs of World War I
Songs with feminist themes
Songs written by Harry J. Lincoln